Savolax and Kymmenegård County was a county of the Kingdom of Sweden (located in what is now Southeastern Finland) from 1747 to 1775.

In 1743, following the Russo-Swedish War of 1741–1743, part of the County of Kymmenegård and Nyslott, including the county capital of Villmanstrand, was ceded to Russia in the Treaty of Åbo. The remaining part of the county was merged in 1747 with some territories from County of Nyland and Tavastehus to a new County of Savolax and Kymmenegård. The county capital was moved to Lovisa.

In 1775 the county was split into the Savolax and Karelia County and the Kymmenegård County.

Maps

Governors 

Henrik Jacob Wrede af Elimä 1747–1753 
Anders Johan Nordenskjöld 1753–1756 
Otto Wilhelm De Geer 1757–1765 
Anders Henrik Ramsay 1765–1774

Former counties of Sweden
Former provinces of Finland